"Somebody Led Me Away" is a song written by Lola Jean Dillon that was originally performed by American country music artist Loretta Lynn. It was released as a single in February 1981 via MCA Records.

Background and reception 
"Somebody Led Me Away" was recorded at the Bradley's Barn in April 1980. Located in Mount Juliet, Tennessee, the session was produced by renowned country music producer Owen Bradley. It was the only song recorded during this particular session. 

"Somebody Led Me Away" reached number twenty on the Billboard Hot Country Singles survey in 1980. It became Lynn's second single in a row to become a major hit. Additionally, reached a minor position in Canada, peaking at number thirty eight on the Canadian RPM Country Songs chart during this same period. It was included on her studio album, Lookin' Good (1980).

Track listings 
7" vinyl single
 "Somebody Led Me Away" – 2:37
 "Everybody's Lookin' for Somebody New"  – 2:27

Charts

References 

1981 songs
1981 singles
MCA Records singles
Loretta Lynn songs
Song recordings produced by Owen Bradley
Songs written by Lola Jean Dillon